The 2006 ICC Americas Championship was a cricket tournament in Canada, taking place between 21 and 26 August 2006. It gave five North and South American Associate and Affiliate members of the International Cricket Council experience of international one-day cricket.

This was the first edition of the Americas Championship in which the tournament was split up into divisions.

Teams

There were 5 teams that played in the tournament. These teams were non-test member nations of the Americas Cricket Association. The teams that played were:

Squads

Group stage

Points Table

Group stage

Statistics

ICC Americas Championship
International cricket competitions in Canada
ICC Americas
2006 in Canadian cricket